Věra Kohnová (26 June 1929 – 1942) was a young Czechoslovakian Jewish diarist who wrote a diary about her feelings and about events during the Nazi occupation. Her diary was published in 2006.

Biography 
Věra Kohnová was born in Plzeň in 1929, into the family of Otakar Kohn, a secretary for the Gustav Teller company. In 1941, at the age of twelve, she began keeping a diary. She wrote in it for five months, during which time the situation of her family and other Jews in Plzeň gradually worsened. She didn't describe the fate of Jews of the time but wrote mainly about her personal feelings. The last entry in her diary is, "We are here just tomorrow and after tomorrow, who knows what will be then. Bye-bye, my diary!".

On 22 January 1942, the family was put on transport "S" to Theresienstadt. The last record of Věra Kohnová comes from 11 March 1942, when she left Theresienstadt on a transport for another Nazi camp in Izbica—a transfer station to the extermination camps. Although she and her family did not survive, her diary was hidden by Marie Kalivodová and Miroslav Matouš for 65 years.

In 2006, the diary was published as a book in Czech, English and German (Czech title: Deník - Věra Kohnová, English: The Diary of Vera Kohnova, German: Das Tagebuch der Vera Kohnova), .

References

See also
 List of Holocaust diarists
 List of diarists
 List of posthumous publications of Holocaust victims

1929 births
1942 deaths
Czech Jews who died in the Holocaust
Writers from Plzeň
Women diarists
Czechoslovak civilians killed in World War II
Theresienstadt Ghetto prisoners
People who died in Izbica Ghetto
20th-century Czech women writers
20th-century Czech writers
Jewish children who died in the Holocaust
Jewish women writers
Children who died in Nazi concentration camps
20th-century diarists
Holocaust diarists